KVAS-FM (103.9 FM, "Eagle Country 103.9") is an American radio station broadcasting a country music format. Licensed to Ilwaco, Washington, United States, the station is currently owned by Ohana Media Group and features programming from Dial Global and Premiere Radio Networks.

References

External links

Country radio stations in the United States
VAS-FM
Pacific County, Washington
Radio stations established in 1983